Cooba Bulga Stream, a mostly perennial stream of the Hunter River catchment, is located in the Hunter region of New South Wales, Australia.

Course
The river flows generally southwest and then south before reaching its confluence with the Munmurra River near . Cooba Bulga Stream descends  over its  course.

See also

 List of rivers of Australia
 List of rivers of New South Wales (A-K)
 Rivers of New South Wales

References

External links
 

 

Rivers of the Hunter Region
Upper Hunter Shire